Burnham-on-Sea Lifeboat Station is the base for Royal National Lifeboat Institution (RNLI) search and rescue operations at Burnham-on-Sea, Somerset in England. A lifeboat was stationed in the town from 1836 until 1930. The present station was opened in 2003. It operates two inshore lifeboats (ILBs), a B Class rigid-inflatable boat and an inflatable D Class.

History

Burnham-on-Sea is on the Bristol Channel near the mouth of the River Parrett. Ships entering the river to Bridgwater have to negotiate sand banks and mudflats. The first lifeboat at Burnham-on-Sea was a gift by Sir Peregrine Acland to the Corporation of Bridgwater in 1836. This was replaced by a new boat in 1847.

In 1866 the RNLI took over the service from the Bridgwater Harbour Trust. A new boat was provided and a new boat house built but this was replaced by a new building in 1874 next to the railway station. A siding was laid to the boat house and the boat on its carriage was hauled down the track by horses to the slipway. The station was closed in 1930 and has since had several uses including a scout hut and children's play centre.

Lifeboats returned to the town in 1994 when the Burnham Area Rescue Boat (BARB) provided an inflatable inshore rescue boat and, from 2003, hovercraft that could operate on the local mudflats. BARB asked the RNLI to take over the provision of a sea-going inshore rescue boat, which it did when a new lifeboat station was built near the old 1874 boat house and brought into use on 23 December 2003.

In 2014, two members of the crew received signed Letters of Appreciation from the Chief Executive of the RNLI for their part in the rescue of 3 teenagers caught in fast flowing water at the end of Burnham-on-Sea jetty the previous summer.

In 2016 Puffin a D-class lifeboat, which had been in service for ten years, was replaced by a new craft named Burnham Reach after a campaign raised the nearly £50,000 which was needed.

Area of operation
Adjacent lifeboats are at Minehead Lifeboat Station to the west, and Weston-super-Mare Lifeboat Station to the north.

Fleet

All-weather lifeboats (1836–1930)

Inshore Lifeboats

D-class

B-class

Notes

See also
 Burnham Area Rescue Boat
 List of RNLI stations

References

External links

 Official station website
 RNLI station information
 An account of Burnham's 1866 lifeboat provided by the people of Cheltenham

Lifeboat stations in Somerset
Burnham-on-Sea